Podocarpus salignus, the willow-leaf podocarp, is a species of coniferous evergreen tree in the family Podocarpaceae. It is found only in Chile, from 35 to 42° south latitude, where it is threatened by habitat loss. The arching branches bear long, narrow, willow-like leaves, and red fleshy oval fruits where male and female plants are grown together. In Chile it is known as Mañío de hojas largas (long-leaved).

Cultivation and uses
This tree is grown in gardens and parks of Chile, and has been introduced to the British Isles. It has gained the Royal Horticultural Society's Award of Garden Merit.

The wood is of good quality, yellowish colored, straight grained, and highly moisture resistant. It is used in furniture and construction.

References and external links

Donoso, C. 2005. Árboles nativos de Chile. Guía de reconocimiento. Edición 4. Marisa Cuneo Ediciones, Valdivia, Chile. 136p.
Hechenleitner, P., M. Gardner, P. Thomas, C. Echeverría, B. Escobar, P. Brownless y C. Martínez. 2005. Plantas Amenazadas del Centro-Sur de Chile. Distribución, Conservación y Propagación. Universidad Austral de Chile y Real Jardín Botánico de Edimburgo, Valdivia. 188p.
Hoffman, Adriana 1982. Flora silvestre de Chile, Zona Araucana. Edición 4. Fundación Claudio Gay, Santiago. 258p.
Rodríguez, R. y M. Quezada. 1995. Gymnospermae. En C. Marticorena y R. Rodríguez [eds.], Flora de Chile Vol. 1, p 310–337. Universidad de Concepción, Concepción.
Bean. W. Trees and Shrubs Hardy in Great Britain. Vol 1 - 4 and Supplement. Murray 1981.
Usher. G. A Dictionary of Plants Used by Man. Constable 1974 .
F. Chittendon. RHS Dictionary of Plants plus Supplement. 1956 Oxford University Press 1951.
Huxley. A. The New RHS Dictionary of Gardening. 1992. MacMillan Press 1992 

 Conifers Around the World: Podocarpus salignus - Willow-Leaf Podocarp

salignus
Trees of Chile
Trees of mild maritime climate
Ornamental trees
Vulnerable plants
Taxonomy articles created by Polbot
Flora of the Valdivian temperate rainforest